The 1914 North Dakota gubernatorial election was held on November 3, 1914. Incumbent Republican L. B. Hanna defeated Democratic nominee Frank O. Hellstrom with 49.58% of the vote.

Primary elections
Primary elections were held on June 24, 1914.

Republican primary

Candidates
L. B. Hanna, incumbent Governor
Usher L. Burdick, former Lieutenant Governor
J. H. Wishek

Results

General election

Candidates
Major party candidates
L. B. Hanna, Republican
Frank O. Hellstrom, Democratic

Other candidates
J. A. Williams, Socialist
Hans H. Aaker, Prohibition

Results

References

1914
North Dakota
Gubernatorial